Parkvilla Football Club are a football club based in Navan, County Meath, Ireland. The club was officially formed in 1966. Parkvilla play their home games at Claremont Stadium, Navan. The club currently competes in the North East Football league Premier Division and their reserve team competes in Division 3B.

Their youth teams play at the 'Ditch Pitch', on the Commons Road. They are said to be the most successful football club within County Meath, Ireland.

External links 
 Official website

Leinster Senior League (association football) clubs
Association football clubs in County Meath
1966 establishments in Ireland